George William Hawking (22 May 1902 – 25 November 1968) was an Australian rules footballer who played with Carlton in the Victorian Football League (VFL).

Family
The son of George Frederick Hawking (1874–1936), and Susan Jane Hawking (1870–1923), née Pugh, George William Hawking was born at Rushworth, Victoria on 22 May 1902.

He married Irene Annie McCrae in 1925.

Football
Recruited from the Rushworth Football Club in the Goulburn Valley Football League, he played four senior games for Carlton in 1927, before returning to Rushworth. He was still playing with Rushworth in September 1938.

Military service
He enlisted in the Second AIF in July 1940, and served overseas with the 2/5 Australian Infantry Battalion.

Death
He died at Edithvale, Victoria on 25 November 1968.

Notes

References
 World War Two Service Record: Corporal George William Hawking (VX34714), National Archives of Australia.
 World War Two Nominal Roll: Corporal George William Hawking (VX34714), Department of Veterans' Affairs.

External links 
 
 
 George Hawking's profile at Blueseum

1902 births
1968 deaths
Carlton Football Club players
Australian rules footballers from Victoria (Australia)
Australian Army personnel of World War II
Australian Army soldiers